Several localities share the name Foulden:
Foulden, Norfolk, England
Foulden, Scottish Borders, Scotland
Foulden, Queensland, Australia (named after the village in Norfolk)
Foulden Maar, a geological formation in Otago, New Zealand